One of the Baffin Island offshore island groups in Cumberland Sound, the Drum Islands are located on the southern side of the mouth of Kangilo Fiord, south of Iglunga, west of Pangnirtung, and north of the Saunik and Imigen islands. They are part of the Qikiqtaaluk Region, in the Canadian territory of Nunavut.

References

External links 
 Drum Islands in the Atlas of Canada - Toporama; Natural Resources Canada
 Map including the Drum Islands

Islands of Cumberland Sound
Archipelagoes of Baffin Island
Uninhabited islands of Qikiqtaaluk Region